The Splendid Sinner is a lost 1918 American silent World War I drama film directed by Edwin Carewe and starring Opera star Mary Garden. It was produced and released by Goldwyn Pictures.

Cast
Mary Garden as Dolores Farqis
Hamilton Revelle as Dr. Hugh Maxwell
Anders Randolf as Rudolph Von Zorn
Hassan Mussalli as Musician
Henry Pettibone as Detective
Roberta Bellinger as Louise
Greater Morgan Dancers as Dancers at Banquet

References

External links

1918 films
Lost American films
Goldwyn Pictures films
Films directed by Edwin Carewe
American silent feature films
American black-and-white films
Silent American drama films
1918 drama films
1918 lost films
1910s American films